Flinders Lofty Block is an interim Australian bioregion located in South Australia.

Subregions
Flinders Lofty Block consists of six subregions
 Mount Lofty Ranges (FLB01) – 
 Broughton (FLB02) – 
 Olary Spur (FLB03) – 
 Southern Flinders (FLB04) – 
 Northern Flinders (FLB05) – 
 Central Flinders (FLB06) – 

The Mount Lofty Ranges and Broughton subregions are part of the Mount Lofty woodlands ecoregion. The other subregions are part of the Tirari–Sturt stony desert ecoregion.

References

Biogeography of South Australia
IBRA regions
Mediterranean forests, woodlands, and scrub in Australia